The O.K. Range, also spelled OK Range, is a mountain range in northern British Columbia, Canada, located northeast of Terrace. It has an area of 347 km2 and is a subrange of the Bulkley Ranges which in turn form part of the Hazelton Mountains.

See also
List of mountain ranges

References

External links

Hazelton Mountains
Skeena Country